The 154th New York State Legislature, consisting of the New York State Senate and the New York State Assembly, met from January 7 to September 19, 1931, during the third year of Franklin D. Roosevelt's governorship, in Albany.

Background
Under the provisions of the New York Constitution of 1894, re-apportioned in 1917, 51 Senators and 150 assemblymen were elected in single-seat districts; senators for a two-year term, assemblymen for a one-year term. The senatorial districts consisted either of one or more entire counties; or a contiguous area within a single county. The counties which were divided into more than one senatorial district were New York (nine districts), Kings (eight), Bronx (three), Erie (three), Monroe (two), Queens (two), and Westchester (two). The Assembly districts were made up of contiguous area, all within the same county.

At this time there were two major political parties: the Democratic Party and the Republican Party. The Law Preservation Party, the Socialist Party, the Communist Party, and the Socialist Labor Party also nominated tickets.

Elections
The New York state election, 1930, was held on November 4. Governor Franklin D. Roosevelt and Lieutenant Governor Herbert H. Lehman, both Democrats, were re-elected. Of the other three statewide elective offices, two were carried by Democrats and one by a Republican judge with Democratic endorsement. The approximate party strength at this election, as expressed by the vote for Governor, was: Democrats 1,770,000; Republicans 1,045,000; Law Preservation 191,000; Socialists 100,000; Communists 18,000; and Socialist Labor 9,000.

Assemblywoman Rhoda Fox Graves (Rep.), of Gouverneur, a former school teacher who after her marriage became active in women's organisations and politics, was re-elected, and remained the only woman legislator.

Sessions
The Legislature met for the regular session at the State Capitol in Albany on January 7, 1931; and adjourned on April 10.

Joseph A. McGinnies (Rep.) was re-elected Speaker.

John Knight was re-elected Temporary President of the State Senate. He was appointed to the United States District Court for the Western District of New York, and resigned as Temporary President. On April 9, George R. Fearon was elected to succeed. Knight vacated his seat on May 1 when he took office as federal judge. After the ouster of Democrat Samuel H. Miller, the election of Republican Charles B. Horton, and the death of the Democratic minority leader Bernard Downing, the Republicans continued to hold a majority of 26 to 23 in the Senate during the special session, 26 being the minimum number of votes to pass a law.

The Legislature met for a special session at the State Capitol in Albany on August 25, 1931; and adjourned on September 19. This session was called to enact legislation to provide for emergency unemployment relief.

State Senate

Districts

Members
The asterisk (*) denotes members of the previous Legislature who continued in office as members of this Legislature. Joseph D. Nunan Jr, Frank B. Hendel, John J. Howard and Julius S. Berg changed from the Assembly to the Senate.

Note: For brevity, the chairmanships omit the words "...the Committee on (the)..."; Chairmanships as appointed at the beginning of the session

Employees
 Clerk: A. Miner Wellman

State Assembly

Assemblymen

Note: For brevity, the chairmanships omit the words "...the Committee on (the)..."

Employees
 Clerk: Fred W. Hammond

Notes

Sources
 Members of the New York Senate (1930s) at Political Graveyard
 Members of the New York Assembly (1930s) at Political Graveyard
 G.O.P. SENATE, ASSEMBLY, PICK COMMITTEES in The Morning Herald, of Gloversville and Johnstown, on January 13, 1931 (front page)
 G.O.P. NAMES COMMITTEES in The Morning Herald, of Gloversville and Johnstown, on January 13, 1931 (page 3)

154
1931 in New York (state)
1931 U.S. legislative sessions